Franz Riegler (26 August 1915 – early January 1989), nicknamed Bobby, was an Austrian footballer who played as an outside right and made three appearances for the Austria national team. He was also known as Franz Riegler I to distinguish him from his compatriot Franz Riegler II of the same era.

Career
Riegler made his international debut for Austria on 27 September 1936 in the 1936–38 Central European International Cup against Hungary, which finished as a 3–5 loss in Budapest. He went on to make three appearances, earning his final cap on 6 December 1945 in a friendly match against France, which finished as a 4–1 win in Vienna.

Personal life
Riegler was born on 26 August 1915 in Vienna. His younger brother, Johann "Hans" Riegler, was also an Austrian international footballer who was included in the country's 1954 World Cup squad. Franz died in early January 1989 at the age of 73, and was buried at the Vienna Central Cemetery on 6 February 1989.

Career statistics

International

References

1915 births
1989 deaths
Footballers from Vienna
Austrian footballers
Austria international footballers
Association football outside forwards
FK Austria Wien players